Øystein Olsen (born 11 January 1969) is a Norwegian former ice hockey player. He was born in Oslo, Norway and played for the club Vålerengens IF. He played for the Norwegian national ice hockey team at the 1992 Winter Olympics.

References

External links

1969 births
Living people
Ice hockey players at the 1992 Winter Olympics
Norwegian ice hockey players
Olympic ice hockey players of Norway
Ice hockey people from Oslo
Vålerenga Ishockey players